Glipa torneensis is a species of beetle in the genus Glipa. It was described in 1917.

References

torneensis
Beetles described in 1917